The women's marathon competition of the athletics events at the 2019 Pan American Games took place on 27 July on a temporary circuit around the Parque Kennedy in Lima, Peru. The defending Pan American Games champion was Adriana Aparecida da Silva of Brazil. Gladys Tejeda from Peru won the gold medal.

Records

Schedule

Abbreviations
All times shown are in hours:minutes:seconds

Results

Report:

References

Athletics at the 2019 Pan American Games
2019
Panamerican
2019
2019 Panamerican Games